Dragon Hunters (French: Chasseurs de dragons) is a 2008 French-German-Luxembourgish 3D computer-animated fantasy film telling the adventures of two dragon hunters, written by Frédéric Engel-Lenoir, directed by creator Arthur Qwak and Guillaume Ivernel with music by Klaus Badelt and produced by Philippe Delarue and Tilo Seiffert. It features the voices of Vincent Lindon, Patrick Timsit, Marie Drion in the French version and Forest Whitaker, Rob Paulsen and Mary Mouser in the English version. The film was produced by Futurikon, and co-produced by LuxAnimation, Mac Guff Ligne and Trixter. It shares the same creative universe as the Dragon Hunters TV series. It was released on March 26, 2008 in France and on March 20, 2008 in Russia and New Zealand. It was also distributed by Icon Productions and Bac Films. The film received a Cristal Award nomination for Best Feature and it earned $12,235,843 on a €12,000,000 budget. Dragon Hunters was released on DVD on April 5, 2008 in the United States by Peace Arch Entertainment, and on November 5, 2008 in France by Warner Home Video.

Plot
Ten years before the TV series begin, The world has become a vast arrangement of floating islands of varying sizes and shapes. This dizzy universe is populated with rogues, peasants, and petty lords. Their main concerns are for survival, for this world has become plagued with hungry creatures, who are wreaking havoc, known as dragons.

Lian-Chu and Gwizdo are two dragon hunters, but they are a long way from being among the best. Lian Chu is a hulking brute with the heart of gold, and Gwizdo is an avaricious, high-strung young man with a talent for scams. Their private dream is to own a farm where they can relax and raise sheep.

A few floating islands away, there is a fortress owned by Lord Arnold. The lord has a problem. He has been living in fear of the return of World Eater, a monstrous dragon that rises every twenty years to spread terror and destruction. Nobody has been able to conquer him. And nobody has ever returned alive or sane enough to tell the tale. Lord Arnold's niece Zoe has decided to take matters into her own hands, and she finds Lian-Chu and Gwizdo to help her. She is convinced that they are the heroes of her dreams, and she goes with them to the end of the earth for a fantastic and dangerous adventure.

Cast
French cast
Vincent Lindon as Lian-Chu
Patrick Timsit as Gwizdo
Marie Drion as Zoé
Philippe Nahon as Lord Arnold
Amanda Lear as Gildas
Jeremy Prevost as Hector
Jean-Marc Lentretien as Mamular

Hungarian cast
István Hajdu (Steve) as Lian-Chu
László Görög as Gwizdo
Lilla Hermann as Zoé
Gábor Reviczky as Lord Arnold
László Tahi Tóth as Gildas

English cast
Forest Whitaker as Lian-Chu
Rob Paulsen as Gwizdo,Lensflair & the Bats
Mary Mouser as Zoé
Nick Jameson as Lord Arnold
Jess Harnell as Gildas
Dave Wittenberg as Hector
John DiMaggio as Fat John

Production
On 14 October 2007, it was announced that Arthur Qwak and Guillaume Ivernel were hired and set to direct Dragon Hunters based on the TV series of the same name by Arthur Qwak. Frédéric Engel-Lenoir and Qwak wrote the script for the film. Philippe Delarue and Tilo Seiffert produced the film with the budget of €12,000,000 for release in 2008. On 19 October, it was announced that Rob Paulsen, Forest Whitaker, Mary Mouser, Nick Jameson, Jess Harnell and Dave Wittenberg from the English dubbed version joined the film. On 10 December 2007, it was announced that Klaus Badelt would compose the music for the film. Development and storyboarding of the film was completed in Paris, France. Production then moved to Berlin, Germany and Luxembourg City, Luxembourg for the final phases of animation, lighting, color and production in order to maximize tax credits offered to foreign film projects in Germany and Luxembourg. On 12 December, Futurikon, Bac Films, Icon Productions and Universum Film (UFA) acquired distribution rights to the film. Dragon Hunters was filmed at France, Germany and Luxembourg in January 2008. Jalan Jalan's single, "Lotus", from his 1999 album Bali, was featured in the film.

Release
An English dubbed version starring the voices of Forest Whitaker, Rob Paulsen and Mary Mouser was released in the United States on 5 April 2008.

Home media
Dragon Hunters was released on DVD on November 5, 2008 in France by Warner Home Video. About 1 Million DVDs (French and English version) were sold in the US.

Reception

Box office
Dragon Hunters grossed €34,068 in France for a worldwide total of $12,235,843. In Brazil, the film opened to number four in its first weekend, behind Horton Hears a Who!, Doomsday and Never Back Down. In its second weekend, the film moved up to number three. In its third weekend, the film dropped to number four. In its fourth weekend, the film dropped to number five, grossing $61,167.

Critical reception
The review aggregation website Rotten Tomatoes surveyed 9 reviews and found 67% of them to be positive, with an average rating of 5.8/10. The site's critical consensus reads: "Like the television series that spawned it, Dragon Hunters is a solidly made thrill fest whose poignant themes of teamwork and friendship will linger long after the end credits."

Awards

Soundtrack

Dragon Hunters: Original Motion Picture Soundtrack is the film's soundtrack album and film score made by Klaus Badelt and released on April 5, 2008 by Skylark Sound Studios. Klaus Badelt scored the music for the film and on its soundtrack. The soundtrack also contains "Lotus" performed by Jalan Jalan.

Songs and music
 Lotus - Performed by Jalan Jalan
 All Music - Composed by Klaus Badelt

See also
 Dragon Hunters

References

External links

 
 
 
 
 

2008 films
2008 3D films
2008 drama films
2008 fantasy films
2008 computer-animated films
2000s French animated films
2000s German animated films
2000s children's drama films
2000s children's fantasy films
2000s children's animated films
2000s French-language films
2000s German-language films
French 3D films
French drama films
French children's films
French animated fantasy films
French computer-animated films
German 3D films
German drama films
German children's films
German animated fantasy films
German computer-animated films
Luxembourgian drama films
Luxembourgian animated fantasy films
3D animated films
Animated films about dragons
Films scored by Klaus Badelt
Warner Bros. films
Warner Bros. animated films
Icon Productions films
2000s English-language films
2000s American films
2000s German films